is a railway station on the Yokohama Subway Blue Line in Tsuzuki-ku, Yokohama, Kanagawa Prefecture, Japan, operated by Yokohama Municipal Subway.

Lines
Nakamachidai Station is served by the Blue Line, and is 34.1 km from the terminus of the Blue Line at Shōnandai Station.

Station layout
Nakamachidai Station has two opposed side platforms serving two tracks. The ground-level station building is located underneath the tracks and platforms.

Platforms

History
Nakamachidai Station was opened on March 18, 1993. Platform edge doors were installed in April 2007.

References
 Harris, Ken and Clarke, Jackie. Jane's World Railways 2008-2009. Jane's Information Group (2008).

External links

 Nakamachidai Station (Blue Line) 

Railway stations in Kanagawa Prefecture
Blue Line (Yokohama)
Railway stations in Japan opened in 1993